Daniele Rossi (born 24 April 1987) is an Italian motorcycle racer.

Career statistics

Grand Prix motorcycle racing

By season

Races by year
(key)

External links
 Profile on MotoGP.com
 Profile on WorldSBK.com

1987 births
Living people
People from Seriate
Italian motorcycle racers
125cc World Championship riders
Sportspeople from the Province of Bergamo